Alonzo Whitney Adams (March 7, 1820 – February 22, 1887) was an American lawyer, politician and military officer. Born in Caroline, New York, he served in the California legislature.

During the Mexican–American War, Adams served as a captain in the U.S. Army.

During the American Civil War Adams fought at the Battle of Antietam as major and commander of the 1st Regiment New York Volunteer Cavalry. He reached the rank of colonel as of July 27, 1864. Adams was mustered out of the volunteers on June 27, 1865. On March 18, 1867, President Andrew Johnson nominated Adams for the rank of brevet brigadier general, to rank from March 13, 1865, and the United States Senate confirmed the nomination on March 28, 1867.

Alonzo W. Adams died February 22, 1887 and is buried at LaGrange, Ohio.

Notes

References
 Eicher, John H., and David J. Eicher, Civil War High Commands. Stanford: Stanford University Press, 2001. .

External links

1820 births
1887 deaths
American military personnel of the Mexican–American War
Union Army colonels
California state senators
People from Tompkins County, New York
19th-century American politicians